Tetraclita squamosa, the green volcano barnacle, is a species of symmetrical sessile barnacle in the family Tetraclitidae.

Subspecies
These subspecies belong to the species Tetraclita squamosa:
 Tetraclita squamosa milleporosa Pilsbry, 1916
 Tetraclita squamosa panamensis Pilsbry, 1916
 Tetraclita squamosa patellaris Darwin, 1854
 Tetraclita squamosa perfecta Nilsson-Cantell, 1931
 Tetraclita squamosa squamosa (Bruguière, 1789)

References

squamosa
Crustaceans described in 1789